is a free-to-play mobile video game for iOS and Android published by Akatsuki and Kadokawa. It was released in Japan on June 27, 2017. A four-panel comedy spin-off manga series by Bkub Okawa titled  and a novelization titled  are being serialized on the game's official website. A 4-episode original net animation adaptation of the four-panel manga titled  was streamed between May and June 2017, and an anime television series adaptation of the original game by TMS Entertainment aired from April 7 to July 7, 2019.

Characters

Tsubasa is a spirited girl who founds the girls' baseball team and seeks to make friends and have them join. She is optimistic and hard to get down. In the anime, she primarily plays shortstop. She bats and throws right-handed and wears number 6.

An old rival of Tsubasa's. She aims to go pro and at first rejects the team for being largely inexperienced, claiming that Tsubasa is not taking the game seriously by playing with them instead of players of similar skill. In the anime, she primarily plays third base. She bats and throws right-handed and wears number 5.

A tall, unsure girl who is at first hesitant to try team sports after turning out to be unsuccessful at basketball and feeling that she let her team down. Yuuki changes her mind and joins the baseball team after seeing how everyone is supportive and refuses to judge one another's failures. In the anime, she is a first baseman and relief pitcher. She bats and throws left-handed and wears number 3.

Tsubasa's best friend, whom she calls Tomocchi. The sensible Tomoe plays the straight man to Tsubasa's less grounded antics. In the anime, she is the team's back-up infielder and first base coach. She bats and throws right-handed and wears number 10.

A shy girl who wears a cat-eared hooded jacket and speaks in the third person. Akane is untalented at baseball, but quickly improves as she tries her best. In the anime, she is the team's back-up outfielder and third base coach. She bats left-handed and throws right-handed and wears number 11.

A tsundere girl who is talented at observation and baseball strategy, but must be convinced to actually play after being let down in childhood. Her supportive brother is part of a prestigious university baseball team. In the anime, she is the team's catcher. She bats and throws right-handed and wears number 2.

A budding reporter who insists on writing stories for the school newspaper, despite the school not actually having one. Peppers "nya" into her speech; the official subtitles change this to cat puns. In the anime, she is the team's center fielder. She bats and throws left-handed and wears number 8.

An overdramatic, hot-blooded second-year from the cheerleading squad. She's noted for not being able to turn down a request. In the anime, she primarily plays left-field. She bats left-handed and throws right-handed and wears number 7.

A second-year with little in the way of tact or personal space and a talent for detail. Aoi ends her sentences with the particle "no da" or "nano da." Extremely good at rock, paper, scissors she is initially the team's third baseman, but later moves to second base. She bats and throws right-handed and wears number 4.

A quiet second-year girl and Yūki's classmate in elementary school who excels in various sports like dodgeball. She often has run-ins with the police as she leaves her house at night to separate herself from her estranged parents. In the anime, she becomes the team's starting pitcher. When she is not pitching, she plays first base. She bats and throws right-handed and wears number 1.

A member of the student council overseeing the athletic clubs. In the anime, she is the team's starting right-fielder. She bats and throws right-handed and wears number 9.

A quiet girl who is occasionally seen interacting with Ayaka and watching the rest of the team from afar.

An anime-original character; she is the student council president.

A teacher at Satogahama High School and the team's adviser.

Media

Game
The mobile game published by Akatsuki and Kadokawa was released for iOS and Android on June 27, 2017. An animated trailer by A-1 Pictures was streamed prior to the game's publication on July 31, 2016. The game is free-to-play.

Manga
A four-panel comedy spin-off manga series by Bkub Okawa titled Hachi Nai Gaiden: Senryoku Gai! Katato-chan is being serialized on the game's official website alongside the novelization. As of November 5, 2019, seventy-two chapters of the manga have been released so far. Another spin-off manga, titled Hachigatsu no Cinderella Nine S, written and illustrated by Kōichirō Hoshino began serialization in Akita Shoten's Weekly Shōnen Champion on August 19, 2021. In March 2022, the manga was transferred to the Manga Cross website.

Novel
A novelization titled Hachigatsu no Cinderella Nine: Before Summer is also being serialized on the official website alongside the four-panel manga. Twelve chapters of the novel have been released so far.

Web animation
An original net animation adaptation of the four-panel manga titled Katato the Animation was streamed on the game's official website and YouTube channel between May and June 2017 with four short episodes. Mako Morino voiced the characters in the anime.

Anime
On July 30, 2018, the official Twitter account of the original game announced that an anime television series adaptation of the game would be produced. The staff and release date for the series were announced on October 25, 2018. The series is directed by Susumu Kudo and animated by TMS Entertainment, with Jin Tanaka writing the scripts and Takayuki Noguchi designing the characters. The cast reprised their roles from the game. It aired from April 7 to July 7, 2019 on TV Tokyo and other channels. The broadcast of episode 8 was delayed for 3 weeks, due to coverage of the 2019 French Open. Sentai Filmworks licensed the show in December 2019 for release across various regions including the Americas, Europe, and Oceania.

The opening theme is  performed by Mewhan, while the ending theme is a cover of Noriyuki Makihara's song , performed by Nozomi Nishida, Reina Kondō, Saki Minami, and Honoka Inoue under their respective character names. Crunchyroll streamed the series.

References

External links
 
 
 
Official Sentai Filmworks website

2017 anime ONAs
2017 video games
2018 Japanese novels
2019 anime television series debuts
Akita Shoten manga
Android (operating system) games
Anime television series based on video games
Baseball in anime and manga
Baseball video games
Crunchyroll anime
Famitsu Bunko
Kadokawa Dwango franchises
IOS games
Japan-exclusive video games
Japanese serial novels
Manga based on video games
Medialink
Sentai Filmworks
Shōnen manga
TMS Entertainment
TV Tokyo original programming
Video games developed in Japan
Women's baseball
Works about women's sports
Yonkoma